Jeri Ingram (born December 11, 1970) is an American former professional tennis player.

Biography
Ingram was born in Washington DC and went to school in Montgomery County, Maryland. In her four-year public high school tennis career she remained unbeaten, with a 106–0 record. She played college tennis for the University of Maryland and was the ACC champion at No. 1 singles in 1989.

As a professional player, Ingram's career included main draw appearances at the 1989 Australian Open and 1993 US Open. She won four ITF singles titles and her best WTA Tour performance was a third round appearance at Stratton Mountain in 1993, with wins over Tammy Whittington and Christina Singer.

Since leaving the professional tour she has been involved in tennis education.

References

External links
 
 

1970 births
Living people
American female tennis players
Tennis players from Washington, D.C.
Maryland Terrapins women's tennis players